Little Flower High School or Little Flower Secondary School may refer to:

 Little Flower High School Thane, Maharashtra, India
 Little Flower High School, a leading high school in Chirag Ali Lane, Hyderabad, Telangana, India
 Little Flower of Jesus High School, a school in Calangute, Goa, India
 Little Flower Convent Higher Secondary School, Irinjalakuda, Kerala, India
 Little Flower School Kalwari, a school in Kalwari, Basti, Uttar Pradesh India
 Little Flower Secondary School, Rabiraj, Septari, Nepal
 Little Flower Catholic High School for Girls, Catholic high school in Philadelphia, Pennsylvania, USA

See also
Little Flower School (disambiguation)
Little Flower (disambiguation)